Cryptocoryne albida is a plant species described by Richard Neville Parker. Cryptocoryne albida is part of the genus Cryptocoryne and the family Araceae. The IUCN categorizes the species globally as least concern. No subspecies are listed.

References 

albida
Plants described in 1931
Flora of China
Flora of India (region)